Le Hoang Diep Thao (Lê Hoàng Diệp Thảo) is a Vietnamese businesswoman and national leader in Vietnam's coffee industry. Together with her husband Dang Le Nguyen Vu, she co-founded Trung Nguyen Group, the country's foremost coffee producing company and among the best-known café chains nationwide. In 2003 she was directly responsible for developing the firm's G7 instant coffee brand, which has stood among the highest performing coffee trading brands in the region, consumed by in excess of a billion people in 60 countries and territories around the globe. She is currently chairwoman and CEO of TNI King Coffee, headquartered in Singapore.

In 2018, Thao was the first Vietnamese speaker invited to speak at the Allegra World Coffee Portal CEO Forum in Los Angeles, USA.

Early life 
Le Hoang Diep Thao was born in 1973 in Gia Lai, Vietnam to a family that conducted business in the gold and silver trade from the early 1960s.

Career 
After her graduation in 1994, Thao started work at the Gia Lai provincial Post Office for its “108” switchboard information service, where she worked for five years answering phone calls and providing information. Noting that the majority of calls to the service were enquiries about the local coffee industry, she sensed a strong potential for a national coffee business that could be based in the region. She met her future husband Dang Le Nguyen Vu, a medical student with aspirations to start a coffee business, when answering his calls to the service.

As the two became romantically involved, Vu and Thao invested in their first coffee enterprise, based in Long Xuyen, which promptly failed. Thao offered to financially support a new coffee business targeting the major metropolitan area of Ho Chi Minh City (Saigon) using her family's resources. The pair married in 1998, securing the financial support, and moved to Ho Chi Minh City to begin the new business—which Vu named “Trung Nguyen”.

The first Trung Nguyen coffee shop was opened at 587 Nguyen Kiem, Phu Nhuan District, Ho Chi Minh City in 1998. The venue was an overnight success following a widely publicised campaign to promote the store's opening, involving the serving of free coffee for the first seven days of operation.

Managing Trung Nguyen behind the scenes while her husband served to direct the vision and the public face of the business, Thao oversaw the development of a Trung Nguyen Coffee Shop chain, pioneering the first franchise in Vietnam. Within two years, the Trung Nguyen brand was attached to more than 1000 coffee shops in Vietnam. The influence of the brand and its transmission of the coffee culture of the Vietnamese Central Highlands throughout Saigon (and later Hanoi) is popularly believed to be responsible for launching a “third wave” of coffee within the country, popularising the drinking of coffee at coffee shops as an affordable leisure pastime for all, and permanently changing the perception and consumption of coffee in the Vietnamese market.

During a business trip to Germany in 2003, Thao became aware of the potential of the instant coffee business, a relatively underexplored market in Vietnam due to a reluctance in the local coffee industry to develop a perceived “fake” variety of coffee. Convincing Vu to support the new line of business—which he named “G7” in reference to his ambition to penetrate the world's most developed markets—Thao led Trung Nguyen to invest in production facilities and launched the brand in Vietnam at a high-profile event at the famous Reunification Palace in Ho Chi Minh City, where during a blind taste test involving 20,000 drinkers, 89 per cent said they preferred G7 over a foreign brand. G7 went on to take the top market share of 38 per cent in the product category within eight years.

In 2006, Thao became Vice Chairman of the Board of Directors as well as the Deputy General Director of Trung Nguyen Group.

In 2008, Thao founded Trung Nguyen International as a springboard to launch the Trung Nguyen and G7 coffee brands internationally. G7 instant coffee became a high-performing commodity traded by the firm, selling in 60 countries around the world and achieving significant market penetration in China, South Korea and the US.

King Coffee 
In 2015, for reasons stemming from personal family issues Thao developed a new coffee brand intended to preserve and enhance the Trung Nguyen business after 20 years in the industry and her continuing efforts to popularise the consumption of Vietnamese coffee. In April 2017, Thao established a new factory at the Nam Tan Uyen Industrial Park to produce a range of King Coffee instant coffee products.

King Coffee was formally launched in 2016 with a glamorous launch on the popular Paris By Night programme, broadcast to Vietnamese viewers in 60 countries simultaneously, as a way to target the entire Vietnamese diaspora at once. The TNI King Coffee brand launched in the Vietnam market in 2017, with the first King Coffee café opening in Pleiku city, Gia Lai. The firm had a valuation upwards of US$60 million by 2018.

In 2020, Thao was elected Vice President of the Vietnam Cocoa Coffee Association for the ninth term and was awarded as Most Admired Entrepreneur in the Vietnamese Food & Beverage sector by Global Brands Magazine (UK). The magazine also voted TNI King Coffee as “Fastest Growing Global Coffee Brand” and “Most Popular Coffee Brand in Vietnam”.

In September 2020, she launched the Women Can Do project in partnership with the Central Vietnam Women's Union, with the goal of reaching 100,000 women to start a business by 2025. She also launched the Happy Farmer foundation as a means to assist grass-roots coffee producers and improve their quality of life.

King Coffee launched its first US coffee shop location in Anaheim, California in May 2021.

References 

Vietnamese businesspeople
1973 births
Living people